Lafajana is a monotypic moth genus in the subfamily Arctiinae. Its single species, Lafajana cupra, is found in Ecuador. Both the genus and species were first described by Paul Dognin in 1891.

References

Arctiini
Monotypic moth genera
Moths of South America